The 2019 Categoría Primera B season (officially known as the 2019 Torneo Águila season for sponsorship reasons) was the 30th season since its founding as Colombia's second division football league.

Format
For this season, the league returned to the format used in 2017. The season consisted of two tournaments (Torneo I and Torneo II) with three stages each. In the first stage of both tournaments, the 16 clubs played each other once, for a total of 15 games. The top eight teams after the first stage advanced to the semifinal round where they were sorted into two groups of four and played a double round-robin tournament group stage, with the top team of each group qualifying to the finals. The winners of both tournaments would play a final series on a home-and-away basis, with the winner being crowned as the season champions and also earning promotion to the Categoría Primera A for the 2020 season. The season runners-up would then play the best team in the aggregate table (other than the champions) in another double-legged series for the second promotion berth. In case the season runner-up also ended up as the best team in the aggregate table, it would also be promoted and the promotion play-off would not be played.

Teams
16 teams took part, fourteen of them returning from last season plus Boyacá Chicó and Leones, who were relegated from the 2018 Primera A after one year in the top flight. Both teams replaced Cúcuta Deportivo and Unión Magdalena who earned promotion at the end of the last season. Also, starting from this season, Real Santander moved its home games to San Andrés Island, becoming Real San Andrés.

On 12 March 2019, the General Assembly of DIMAYOR approved a proposal to relocate Universitario from Popayán to Cali starting from the second half of the season, with the aforementioned club being effectively rebranded as Boca Juniors de Cali. Universitario played its last match in the tournament under that name on 4 May 2019, losing to Deportivo Pereira in Palmira by a 4–1 score.

a: Universitario played their home matches against Llaneros, Bogotá, Leones and Deportivo Pereira at Estadio Deportivo Cali in Palmira.

Torneo I

First stage

Standings

Results

Semifinals
The eight teams that advanced to the semifinals were drawn into two groups of four teams. The winners of each group advanced to the finals.

Group A

Group B

Finals

Tied 3–3 on aggregate, Deportivo Pereira won on penalties.

Top goalscorers

Source: Soccerway

Torneo II

First stage

Standings

Results

Semifinals
The eight teams that advanced to the semifinals were drawn into two groups of four teams. The winners of each group will advance to the finals.

Group A

Group B

Finals

Deportivo Pereira won 3–2 on aggregate.

Top goalscorers

Source: Soccerway

Grand Final
Since Deportivo Pereira won both tournaments of the season, the Grand Final was not played and they were declared as champions of the season. Deportivo Pereira also earned direct promotion to Categoría Primera A for the 2020 season.

Aggregate table

Promotion play-off
The promotion play-off was played by Boyacá Chicó and Cortuluá, who were the best two teams in the aggregate table excluding the champions, Deportivo Pereira. The winners of this double-legged series earned the second promotion berth.

Boyacá Chicó won 1–0 on aggregate.

See also
 2019 Categoría Primera A season
 2019 Copa Colombia

References

External links 
  

Categoría Primera B seasons
1
Colombia